Events in the year 1999 in Moldova.

Incumbents
 President – Vladimir Voronin
 Prime Minister – Ion Sturza, Dumitru Braghiș
 President of the Parliament – Dumitru Diacov

Events

May
 May 11 - The 22nd Peacekeeping Battalion is founded.

 May 23 - A nationwide constitutional referendum; Local elections take place.

June
 June 7 - The Bogdan Petriceicu Hasdeu State University is founded in Cahul.

August
 August 15 - The Republican Party of Moldova is founded.

September 
 September 1 - Prime is established.

 September 3 - ProTV Chișinău is established.

 September 25 - The Labour Party is founded.

October
 October 22 - Taraclia County is established.

References

 
1990s in Moldova
Moldova
Moldova